The 2016 Atlanta Braves season was the Braves' 20th and last season of home games at Turner Field before moving to SunTrust Park, 51st season in Atlanta and 146th season overall. They finished in last place in the National League East Division.

The Braves played 22 extra-inning games during the season, the most of any MLB team in 2016.

Season standings

National League East

National League Wild Card

Record vs. opponents

Detailed records

Season summary

The 2016 season was the Braves' final season at Turner Field, before moving to their new home at SunTrust Park. The stadium was originally built as a venue for the 1996 Summer Olympics before being converted for use by the Braves for the 1997 season. The team scheduled a number of special events and limited-edition giveaways in honor of its final season at Turner and the players wore a commemorative sleeve patch on their uniforms for the entire season. The patch showed an outline of the stadium with the words "Turner Field; Final Season, 19972016".

April

Opening Day and first series vs. Nationals

The Braves began their season with a 4–3 loss in 10 innings after blowing the save in the top of the 9th. Nick Markakis of the Braves fell afoul of Major League Baseball's new "Chase Utley Rule" in the 7th inning when he slid too far out to the left of second base and initially prevented Daniel Murphy of the Nationals from making the double play.

The Braves ended their two-game series against the Nationals with a 3–1 loss after Matt den Dekker, who had been called up from the Syracuse Chiefs just a few hours prior, hit a two-run double to right-center.

Consecutive series sweeps
Despite opening up their next series with a four-run lead, the Braves gave up seven unanswered runs in a 7–4 loss to the Cardinals. Atlanta also gave up an MLB record three home runs to pinch hitters. In the second of the three-game series against the Cardinals, the Braves allowed nine unanswered runs in a 12–2 loss. After the loss, the Braves were the only team in the National League to have not won a single game yet. Atlanta closed out a three-game series against the Cardinals with a 12–7 loss. Braves pitcher Daniel Winkler suffered an elbow fracture after pitching 6 2/3rd's innings.

Things didn't improve on the first road trip of the season as the Braves lost 6–4 to the Nationals and fell to 0–6 for the first time since 1988. Mallex Smith, who earned a hit in his MLB debut, left the game in the fourth inning after suffering a cut to his face by his helmet. After eight scoreless innings in the second game of the series, Bryce Harper brought in two runs on a double to left field and the Nationals won 2–1. Home runs by Stephen Drew and Jayson Werth in the fourth inning handed the Braves their eighth loss of the season as the Nationals won 3–0. The Braves ended their road series against the Nationals with a 6–2 loss.

First wins vs. Marlins
After trailing 3–0 against the Marlins, the Braves scored six unanswered runs to win their first game of the season. Jason Grilli earned his first save since July 2015 with a 6–4 win over the Marlins in the second game of the series. The Braves swept the series over the Marlins with a 6–5 victory in a 10-inning game.

Continued struggles
The Braves earned their fourth win of the season against former Braves pitcher Alex Wood and the Los Angeles Dodgers in a lopsided 8–1 game at Turner Field. Wood said after the game that it "was not really the way I pictured coming back here for the first time. Fastball command was the most frustrating thing. I don't even know if I've walked in a run before in my professional career. The walks were pretty frustrating. It was a tough one to swallow, but I have another one in five days." Despite a 3-1 lead, the Dodgers scored four unanswered runs to snap the Braves four-game win streak. A Yasmani Grandal double in the 10th inning gave the Dodgers a 2–1 victory in the Braves's fourth extra-inning game of the season.

The Braves opened their next series with a 6–3 loss to the New York Mets. In the second game of the series, the Braves lost 8–2. The Braves ended their three-game series against the Mets with a 3–2 loss.

In their first interleague series of the season, former Braves closer Craig Kimbrel earned his 94th career save at Turner Field in a 1–0 victory over the Braves. In the second game of the series, David Price pitched 14 strikeouts to secure an 11–4 victory over the Braves. 
In the third game of the series and first of two at Fenway Park, the Braves surrendered a grand slam to Dustin Pedroia in a 9–4 loss to the Red Sox. Freddie Freeman ended the Braves's 15-game home run-less streak with a deep ball into right-center field in the eighth inning. In the final game of the series, three RBI's by Markakis contributed to the Braves ending their eight-game losing skid with a 5–3 victory over the Red Sox.

Despite a Freeman home run in the fourth inning, the Braves allowed six unanswered runs, including their fourth grand slam of the season, in a 6–1 loss to the Cubs.

May

4–10 start
A sacrifice fly by Markakis in the 10th inning allowed Daniel Castro to score the go-ahead run and beat the Cubs 4–3.

In his 2016 debut, Mike Foltynewicz gave up three home runs in a 4–1 loss to the Mets. In the second game of the series, pitcher Matt Wisler surrendered one hit and earned his first win of the season in a 3–0 game against the Mets. The Braves fell 8–0 in the series finale to the Mets. Primary leadoff hitter Markakis wasn't in the lineup for the series finale as he traveled back home to Baltimore to tend to a family emergency.

Two errors by the Braves led to a 7–2 loss in the first of three games against the Diamondbacks. Former Braves starting pitcher Shelby Miller earned his first win of the season in a 4–2 victory over the Braves. Despite a two-run RBI by Jeff Francoeur to tie the game, the Braves gave up two home runs in the 11th inning in a 5–3 loss to the Diamondbacks.

Despite a ninth inning home run from Freeman and two players in scoring position, the Braves lost 3–2 in the first of three games against the Phillies. After being recalled from Triple-A Gwinnett, Williams Pérez surrendered one hit in eight innings pitched in a 5–1 victory over the Phillies. Despite a three-run double by Gordon Beckham in the seventh inning, the Braves were unable to capitalize with runners in walk off position in the ninth and fell 7–4 to the Phillies in the 10th.

The Braves opened up a three-game road series with a 5–1 loss to the reigning World Series champion Kansas City Royals. Foltynewicz earned his first win of the season with a 5–0 victory over the Royals. Despite tying the game in the ninth inning, Grilli gave up a two-run walk off home run to Kendrys Morales to fall 4–2 in the 13th inning. Despite home runs from Francoeur and Kelly Johnson, the Braves fell 8–5 to the Pittsburgh Pirates.

González and Tosca dismissed
On May 17, Fredi González was fired from his position as team manager, as was Carlos Tosca from his position as bench coach. Brian Snitker, manager of Triple-A Gwinnett, was promoted to interim manager of the Atlanta Braves. His debut didn't fare too well as, despite a season-high of nine runs, a seven-run deficit in the first inning proved too much to overcome in a 12–9 loss. Tyler Flowers hitting in three of four plate appearances and Julio Teherán surrendering only five hits gave Snitker his first win as an MLB manager in a 3–1 victory over the Pirates. The Braves closed out this four-game road series with an 8–2 loss. Regular shortstop Erick Aybar was removed from the lineup after undergoing a procedure to remove a dislodged chicken bone.

Despite surrendering a run in the first inning, three two-run home runs from Freeman and Markakis gave the Braves a 7–1 victory in the first of three games against the Phillies. Pérez allowed only two hits in 6 1/3 innings pitched to give the Braves their second series victory of the season in a 2–0 win over the Phillies. The Braves were unable to pull off a sweep of the series as they fell 5–0 to the Phillies.

The Braves opened up their next series back home with a 2–1 loss to the Brewers. Despite the loss, Julio Teherán recorded a career-high 12 strikeouts, including four in one inning. The Braves couldn't capitalize on loaded bases in the 12th inning, gave up a run on a single by Jonathan Villar and lost 3–2 in 13 innings. The Braves concluded their three-game series against the Brewers with a 6–2 loss.

Despite surrendering two runs in the third inning, key hits by Freeman and Markakis led to four unanswered runs scored by the Braves in a 4–2 win over the Marlins. The Braves earned their first home series win of the season in a 7-2 victory over the Marlins. The Braves failed to sweep the Marlins for the second time this season in a 7–3 loss to conclude the series.

The Braves opened up their next series with a 5–3 win over the Giants. Wisler put on a solid pitching performance until he allowed three runs in the eighth inning and the Braves fell 4–0.

June

More struggles
Despite trailing 4–1 at a point in the game, Markakis scored the tying run on a wild pitch in the bottom of the ninth inning, Chris Withrow kept the Braves in the game with his relief performance and Freeman hit a walk-off home run to right-center to beat the Giants 5–4 in the 11th inning. The Braves concluded their home-stand with a 6–0 loss to the Giants after squandering an early scoring opportunity by Chase d'Arnaud and Freeman in the first inning.

Despite opening the game with a two-run lead, the Braves surrendered four home runs, including three to Corey Seager, in a 4–2 loss to the Dodgers. Despite holding Clayton Kershaw to his shortest outing of the season and fewest strikeouts in over two years, the offensive-inept Braves were unable to capitalize and fell 4–0 to the Dodgers. The Braves concluded their series against the Dodgers by giving up multiple home runs in a 12–6 loss.

The Braves opened their next three-game series with Pérez exiting the game due to triceps soreness in the fifth inning and falling 7–2 to the Padres. Despite carrying a one-run lead into the ninth inning, Arodys Vizcaíno blew the save by surrendering a home run and a walk off single in a 4–3 loss. The Braves concluded their series with the Padres with Teherán surrendering just two runs in eight innings. Vizcaíno, who blew the save the night before, earned the save and the Braves won 4–2.

Back home at the Ted after a six-game road trip, Bud Norris pitched seven innings and gave up only four hits and one run as the Braves won 5-1 over the Cubs. The next game in the series saw Anthony Rizzo, who was scratched from the lineup the day before due to back issues, hit his 14th home run of the season as the Braves fell 8-2 to the Cubs. The Braves closed out their three-game series with a 13-2 loss to the Cubs.

Turnaround
Despite a scoring opportunity with bases loaded in the eighth inning, the Braves squandered it, gave up a shallow left hit to Joey Votto with bases loaded and lost 9-8 to the Reds. After a rough first inning for Teherán, the Braves only put up a run in a 3-1 loss to the Reds. After failing to score a walk off with bases loaded in the 11th and giving up two runs in the top of the 13th, a single by d'Arnaud allowed Jace Peterson to score the walk off run and gave the Braves a 9-8 victory. During the game, Freeman doubled in the third, tripled in the fourth, hit a home run in the sixth and singled in the 11th to become only the seventh Braves player to hit for the cycle and first to do so since Mark Kotsay in 2008. The Braves concluded the four-game series with two home runs from Freeman in a 7-2 victory over the Reds.

In the first of a five-game road trip, Braves relief pitcher John Gant pitched six and 2/3 innings and allowed only one run and two hits to earn his first win in Major League Baseball in a 5-1 victory over the Mets. After Inciarte scored the go-ahead run in the eighth inning, relief pitcher Jim Johnson struck out Curtis Granderson to earn his first save of the season and give the Braves the series victory in a 4-3 win over the Mets. Teherán pitched a complete game, gave up only one hit, kept the Mets from putting up a run in a 6-0 win and gave the Braves their longest win streak of the season.

Despite trailing 2-0 going into the eighth inning, Peterson tied the game with a two-run homer and hit the go-ahead RBI single to give the Braves their sixth straight win in a 3-2 victory over the Marlins. The Braves' six-game win streak came to an end in a 3-0 loss to the Marlins.

The Braves opened up their next series at home with a two-run go-ahead homer by Adonis García in the eighth inning to beat the Mets 4-3 Despite a six-run rally in the fifth inning, the Braves were unable to overcome the eight-run deficit they found themselves in early in the game and lost 8-6 to the Mets. After a scoreless pitching duel between Jacob deGrom and Teherán and going into extra innings, Kelly Johnson – who was traded from the Braves to the Mets earlier in the month – hit the game-winning home run in the 11th inning to hand the Braves a 1-0 loss. The Braves concluded the four-game series with home runs from Freeman and Garcia and a 5-2 victory over the Mets.

The Braves started their next series with an 8-3 loss to the Indians who came into the game riding a nine-game win streak. Starting pitcher Gant left the game in the third inning due to a left oblique strain. Despite tying the game in the sixth inning, an RBI single by Carlos Santana in the ninth inning led to a three-run rally by the Indians and the Braves fell 5-3. The Braves concluded the series with a 3-0 loss to the Indians who earned their 12th straight victory.

Despite giving up a three-run homer in the second inning, seven unanswered runs and a save by Mauricio Cabrera gave the Braves an 8-5 victory in the first of a four-game series against the Marlins.

July
Despite a game-tying home run in the bottom of the ninth by Tyler Flowers and bases loaded in the 10th and 11th inning, a two-run double by pinch-hitter José Fernández in the 12th inning gave the Marlins a 7-5 victory over the Braves. The next day proved rough for Fernández as he surrendered eight hits, six runs and a walk in five and 2/3rd's innings pitched as the Braves beat the Marlins 9-1.

Fort Bragg Game
The Braves concluded their four-game series against the Marlins with a 5-2 loss in the Fort Bragg Game, the first ever Major League Baseball game played at a United States military installation in Fort Bragg.

The Braves opened their next series by surrendering seven runs in the second inning in an 8-2 loss to the Phillies. Foltynewicz gave up four homers in six innings pitched in a 5-1 loss to the Phillies. Despite carrying a one-run lead into the eighth inning, a two-run homer by Freddy Galvis gave a 4-3 victory to the Phillies.

In a makeup game postponed from April 30 due to rain, Markakis hit two home runs - including the game-tying home run in the ninth – and Flowers hit a two-out single in the 11th inning to give the Braves a 4-3 victory over the Cubs.

The Braves put on their best offensive output of the season to date with 15 hits, eight of which came in the fifth inning alone, 11 runs – four of which also came in the fifth inning – and three home runs from Flowers, Freeman and Markakis to beat the White Sox 11-8 in the first of a three-game series. Three home runs weren't enough to overcome a five-run deficit as the Braves fell 5-4 to the White Sox in the second game of the series. The Braves concluded the series with Foltynewicz allowing five hits, no runs and two homers scored by Francoeur and Peterson to beat the White Sox 2-0.

After All-Star break
In their first game following the All-Star break, the Braves gave up 11 runs – including a grand slam in the ninth inning – in an 11-2 loss to the Rockies. Despite leading by three runs going into the eighth inning and Foltynewicz only surrendering two hits in 7 1/3 innings pitched, four different pitchers in the eighth allowed the Rockies to rally back, allowed Trevor Story to score the go-ahead run, ended a 43-game losing streak when trailing after seven innings and resulted in a 4-3 loss to the Rockies. After eight and a half innings of a scoreless pitching duel between Teherán and Jon Gray, d'Arnaud hit a walk off single off Gonzalez Germen that allowed Inciarte to score and gave the Braves a 1-0 victory over the Rockies.

Despite scoring first with an RBI double from Francoeur in the fourth inning, the Braves surrendered three home runs in an 8-2 loss to the Reds. Despite a blown save opportunity by Johnson, a sacrifice fly by Inciarte in the 11th led to the go-ahead run that gave the Braves a 5-4 victory. The Braves closed out the series with two home runs, but squandered a two-run lead to fall 6-3 to the Reds.

The Braves opened up their next road series by surrendering a three-run homer in the sixth inning and falling 6-3 to the Rockies. Despite loading the bases with one out in the ninth inning, the Braves were unable to capitalize and fell 4-3 to the Rockies. Teherán exited the game in the fifth inning with upper back discomfort. What had started as a strong outing for Wisler with only surrendering two hits after five innings pitched turned into a five-run collapse in the sixth inning as the Braves fell 8-4 to the Rockies. The Braves concluded the four-game series by surrendering seven runs, including a home run, in a 7-2 loss to the Rockies.

Lucas Harrell held the Twins to four singles and three walks over six innings pitched as the Braves ended a five-game losing streak with a 2-0 win in the first of two games against the Twins. The Braves concluded the two-game series with every player in the lineup earning one hit, three players hitting home runs, Foltynewicz earned the victory and Johnson earned the save in a 9-7 victory over the Twins.

Five unanswered runs weren't enough to overcome a seven-run deficit, four of which came in the first inning alone, as the Braves fell 7-5 in the first of a four-game home series against the Phillies. Tyrell Jenkins surrendered one unearned run, four hits and four walks to earn his first career victory and Johnson earned his fifth save of the season as the Braves beat the Phillies 2-1. A blown 2-1 lead through the fifth inning progressed into the Phillies accumulating no hits, four walks, two errors, a hit batter and four runs while batting around in the eighth inning and the Braves fell 9-5. The Braves closed out the four-game series against the Phillies with a two-run homer by Francouer in a 2-1 victory.

August
Despite putting up the first run of the game and not allowing a hit through the first four innings, the Braves – thanks in part to Foltynewicz's struggles with batters the third time up – gave up five runs, including a home run to Matt Joyce, in a 5-3 loss to the Pirates. Despite allowing four runs in the first inning, the Braves rallied back to score eight unanswered runs and earned Rob Whalen his first career victory as a major league pitcher in an 8-4 win over the Pirates. The Braves concluded their three-game home stand, thanks to an improbable stolen base attempt by García in the seventh inning, with a 5-2 victory to win the series against the Pirates.

While Joel De La Cruz only surrendered two hits and five walks over 5 1/3rd innings pitched, Jaime García hit the go-ahead RBI with a single in the second inning and the Braves fell 1-0 in the first of three games against the Cardinals. Three-run homers from Freeman and García, and two-run homers from Inciarte and trade deadline acquisition Matt Kemp contributed to the Braves highest offensive output of the season in a 13-5 rout of the Cardinals. The Braves concluded the three-game road series with Foltynewicz holding the Cardinals to one run and six hits, scored his first career run and Johnson earned his eighth save of the season in a 6-3 victory.

A sacrifice fly to the center-field warning track by Beckham allowed Kemp to score the go-ahead run in the 12th and the Braves won 4-3 in the first of four games against the Brewers. Despite giving up the first run of the game off a Ryan Braun home run, the Braves scored two runs on a walk and three singles in the seventh inning to win the second game of the series 2-1. Two home runs from Freeman weren't enough to overcome a three-run homer by Chris Carter in the third inning as the Braves fell 4-3. In the final game of the series, the Brewers scored a run in every inning of the game – only the eighth time this feat has occurred since 1961 – as the Braves could only put up an Aybar homer in an 11-3 loss.

A three-run homer by Freeman and a solo home run by Peterson led to the Braves snapping a 14-game losing streak at Nationals Park in an 8-5 win in the first of three games against the Nationals. A four-run rally in the ninth inning wasn't enough to overcome a five-run deficit as the Braves fell 7-6 in the second game of the series. The Braves concluded the three-game series and 10-game stretch on the road by surrendering a three-run homer to Anthony Rendon in a 9-1 loss to the Nationals.

A two-run rally in the bottom of the eighth to pull to within a run was not enough to overcome the three-run deficit or a Trevor Plouffe RBI in the top of the ninth as the Braves dropped fell 4-2 in the first of a two-game interleague series against the Twins. The Braves concluded their two-game series against the Twins by surrendering 10 runs in a 10-3 loss.

Despite pulling to within a run off a Kemp groundout in the sixth inning, the Nationals went on a five-run tear in the eighth to beat the Braves 8-2 in the first of a four-game series. Despite a three-run rally in the eighth to tie the game, Clint Robinson hit a go-ahead RBI single to left field that handed the Braves their sixth straight loss in a 7-6 defeat. A late rally by the Braves wasn't enough to overcome giving up eight runs in the fourth inning as the Braves lost their seventh straight game in an 11-9 defeat. The Braves concluded the four-game series against the Nationals with a walk-off homer from Peterson in the 10th inning to snap a seven-game losing streak in a 7-6 victory.

Despite two homers from Freeman, Vizcaíno blew a 7-4 lead in the seventh inning and Gant gave up a walk-off homer to Paul Goldschmidt in the ninth as the Braves fell 9-8 in the first of a four-game series against the Diamondbacks. Trailing by a run with three runners on base and two outs in the eighth inning, Kemp hit a base-clearing double to right-field that put the Braves ahead and went on to win 7-4. A four-run rally in the ninth inning tied the game, but a sacrifice fly by former Braves prospect Brandon Drury allowed Jake Lamb to score the winning run in the 11th inning and the Braves fell 10-9. After a stint in AAA, Wisler surrendered only one run and two hits with four strikeouts and three walks as the Braves used the three runs scored in the third inning to split the series with the Diamondbacks in a 3-1 victory.

Despite loading the bases in both the first and second innings, the Braves were unable to score a run and surrendered five runs in those first two innings in a 7-2 loss in the first of three games against the Giants. A three-run homer by Kemp in the fourth inning and one run surrendered in 7 2/3rd innings pitched by Foltynewicz was enough to secure a 3-1 win for the Braves in the second game of the series. The Braves concluded the series by surrendering four homers in a 13-4 loss to the Giants.

In their return to Turner Field on August 30, the Braves put on an offensive showcase with 12 hits and scored on six of those hits to win 7-3 in the first of a three-game series against the Padres. The next day, the Braves continued their high offensive output with 12 hits and eight runs scored, including an Inciarte run scored off a Paul Clemens balk in the first inning, to beat the Padres 8-1 in the second game of the series.

September
The Braves concluded the three-game series against the Padres on September 1 with another high offensive output, that included a Freeman homer that kick-started a five-run rally in the fifth inning, as they earned their first home sweep of the season in a 9-6 victory.

Back on the road in Philadelphia on September 2, the Braves, starting the top of the ninth inning with the game tied 4-4, batted around with hits from Inciarte, Garcia, Freeman, Kemp, Markakis and Freeman a second time to score five runs, and win 9-4 in the first of a three-game series against the Phillies. The next night, two homers from Garcia, a fielders choice grounder from Flowers to drive in the go-ahead run and a ground out from Peterson to bring in another run gave the Braves a 6-4 victory in the second game of the series. In the final game of the three-game series, Teheran gave up only five hits and struck out seven batters in six innings pitched, Kemp hit his 28th homer of the season in the second and Freeman hit his 29th in the eighth, and Johnson earned his 15th save of the season to beat the Phillies 2-0.

In the first game of a three-game series in the nation's capital, a fielder's choice RBI by Peterson and a two-run rally in the ninth wasn't enough to overcome a five-run deficit – a two-run homer by Trea Turner and a three-run homer by Chris Heisey, both in the third inning – and the Braves's six-game win streak was snapped with a 6-4 loss to the Nationals. After Perez gave up a 4-1 lead in the third inning of the second game of the series, which included a Rendon grand slam and a homer from Ryan Zimmerman, the Braves rallied back with RBI's from Dansby Swanson and Joel De La Cruz to tie the game at 6-6. However, the Nationals responded with a three-run eighth inning, which included Michael Taylor scoring on a Flowers throwing error, and a Swanson single RBI in the ninth wasn't enough to prevent a 9-7 loss. In the final game of the series, Chris Withrow blew a two-run lead in the seventh inning and the game eventually went into extra innings. A Peterson RBI single in the 10th put the Braves up a run in the 10th, but Rendon responded with an RBI single to tie the game again. A walk-off single by Wilson Ramos in the 11th secured a 5-4 victory for the Nationals.

The Braves started the first of a three-game series on September 9 with a 4-0 lead, but a six-run unanswered rally – which included a two-run homer by Curtis Granderson – by the Mets beginning in the sixth inning led to a 6-4 defeat for the Braves. In the second game of the series, Kemp tied the game with a homer in the sixth and a walk-off RBI single by Garcia in the 10th gave the Braves a 4-3 victory over the Mets. In the final game of the series, the Braves gave up 10 runs – including a third inning grand slam by Yoenis Céspedes – in a 10-3 loss to the Mets.

In the first of a three-game series against the Marlins on September 12, the Braves put up seven unanswered runs in the first three innings – including a Markakis homer – before giving up seven runs to the Marlins. The Braves responded with five runs to beat the Marlins 12-7. Five runs, including a two-run homer by Freeman and a solo homer by Kemp, were not enough to overcome seven runs by the Marlins in a 7-5 loss in the second game of the series. In the final game of the series, benches cleared after José Ramírez threw a pitch that went behind the head of Marlins pitcher José Fernández. No punches were thrown and Ramírez was ejected from the game. The Marlins went on to win 7-5.

In the first of a three-game series against the Nationals on September 16, Max Scherzer surrendered only two runs in seven innings pitched, the Nationals put up seven runs, including a two-run homer from Turner, and the Braves fell 7-2. Despite surrendering a lead-off homer to Tuner to start the second game of the series, the Braves responded with six runs off nine hits in the fifth inning and beat the Nationals 7-3. In the final game of the series, Wisler surrendered just two runs and Garcia drove in three runs before the game was called in the bottom of the seventh, and the Braves won their first series against the Nationals this season in the final game against the NL East rival for the season.

In the first of a three-game road series against the Mets on September 19, the Braves put up seven runs, including a solo homer by Freeman, and Blair surrendered just two runs off four hits in six innings pitched to earn his first victory of the season in a 7-3 win over the Mets. In the second game, the Braves put up five runs, including a three-run homer in the seventh inning by Garcia, and Johnson earned the save to win series in a 5-4 victory over the Mets. The Mets jumped to a three-run lead in the final game of the series, but the Braves rallied back with four unanswered runs, which included a two-run homer by Anthony Recker in the seventh inning, to take the lead in the top of the ninth. In an almost exact repeat of the night before, Braves closer Johnson faced off against Cespedes with two outs in the bottom of the ninth. Cespedes hit the ball to deep right-center and had the distance for a three-run homer, but center fielder Inciarte raced towards the wall, made the jump and caught the ball above the fence to get the final out for a 4-3 Braves victory in their final game of the season against the Mets.

In the first of a four-game road series against the Marlins on September 22, the Braves put up six runs, including two homers from Kemp totaling three runs, in a 6-3 victory over the Marlins. In the second game of the series, the Braves rallied back from a two-run deficit to score three unanswered runs and beat the Marlins 3-2. In the third inning, Kemp was ejected, and so was manager Snitker, for arguing with the home plate umpire over a 3-1 pitch call. Despite Freeman's adding to his 28-game hit streak with two hits and a homer, the Braves couldn't overcome Blair surrendering six hits, five runs and three walks in 3 1/3 innings pitched, and fell 6-4 for only the second time at Marlins Park in 2016 in the third game of the series. The final game of the series was cancelled following the news that Marlins pitcher José Fernández died in a boating accident earlier that morning. The game was never made up as the season was nearly ending and both teams were out of playoff contention.

In the first of a three-game home series against the Phillies on September 28, the Braves found themselves in a six-run hole, largely due to Teheran surrendering a grand slam homer in the first inning. However, they scored seven unanswered runs and beat the Phillies 7-6. High offensive output defined the second game of the series as the Braves put up 12 runs, nine of which were surrendered by Adam Morgan, in a 12-2 win over the Phillies. With the score tied at one in the bottom of the eighth, Kemp opened the floodgates with an RBI double into right field that allowed Swanson to score and the Braves swept the Phillies 5-2 in the final division series of the season.

In the first game of the final series of the season and final series at Turner Field on September 30, the Braves put up just two runs, via solo homers from Kemp and Brandon Snyder, against six runs by the wild-card hopeful Detroit Tigers, three of which came via two Miguel Cabrera homers, in a 6-2 loss.

October
In the second game of the series against the Tigers on October 1, the Braves damaged the Tigers' wild-card hopes with five runs, including a two-run homer by Freeman and a solo homer by Markakis, in a 5-3 victory. In the final game of the season, and last at Turner Field, the Braves beat the Tigers 1-0 with Freddie Freeman's first-inning sacrifice fly providing the only run of the game to finish the season at 68-93, and for the first time all season, the Braves did not have the worst record in the National League. This win eliminated the Tigers from postseason contention.

Game log

|- style="background:#fbb;"
| 1 || April 4 || Nationals || 3–4 (10) || Treinen (1–0) || O'Flaherty (0–1) || Papelbon (1) || 48,282 || 0–1 || L1
|- style="background:#fbb;"
| 2 || April 6 || Nationals || 4–6 || Strasburg (1–0) || Norris (0–1) || Papelbon (2) || 18,531 || 0–2 || L2
|- style="background:#fbb;"
| 3 || April 8 || Cardinals || 4–7 || Siegrist (1–0) || O'Flaherty (0–2) || Rosenthal (1) || 24,824 || 0–3 || L3
|- style="background:#fbb;"
| 4 || April 9 || Cardinals || 2–12 || Martinez (1–0) || Teherán (0–1) || — || 33,471 || 0–4 || L4
|- style="background:#fbb;"
| 5 || April 10 || Cardinals || 7–12 || Oh (1–0) || Johnson (0–1) || Rosenthal (2) || 23,214 || 0–5 || L5
|- style="background:#fbb;"
| 6 || April 11 || @ Nationals || 4–6 || Scherzer (1–0) || Norris (0–2) || Papelbon (4) || 18,119 || 0–6 || L6
|- style="background:#fbb;"
| 7 || April 12 || @ Nationals || 1–2 || Treinen (2–0) || Johnson (0–2) || Rivero (1) || 18,378 || 0–7 || L7
|- style="background:#fbb;"
| 8 || April 13 || @ Nationals || 0–3 || Roark (1–1) || Wisler (0–1) || Papelbon (5) || 19,400 || 0–8 || L8 
|- style="background:#fbb;"
| 9 || April 14 || @ Nationals || 2–6 || Strasburg (2–0) || Teherán (0–2) || — || 21,144 || 0–9 || L9
|- style="background:#cfc;"
| 10 || April 15 || @ Marlins || 6–3 || Ogando (1–0) || Phelps (2–1) || Vizcaíno (1) || 18,071 || 1–9 || W1
|- style="background:#cfc;"
| 11 || April 16 || @ Marlins || 6–4 || Norris (1–2) || Koehler (0–2) || Grilli (1) || 33,123 || 2–9 || W2
|- style="background:#cfc;"
| 12 || April 17 || @ Marlins || 6–5 (10) || Grilli (1–0) || Jackson (0–1) || Wisler (1) || 24,780 || 3–9 || W3
|- style="background:#cfc;"
| 13 || April 19 || Dodgers || 8–1 || Weber (1–0) || Wood (1–2) || — || 14,160 || 4–9 || W4
|- style="background:#fbb;"
| 14 || April 20 || Dodgers || 3–5 (10) || Blanton (1–1) || Grilli (1–1) || Jansen (6) || 16,087 || 4–10 || L1
|- style="background:#fbb;"
| 15 || April 21 || Dodgers || 1–2 (10) || Hatcher (2–1) || Ogando (1–1) || Jansen (7) || 18,431 || 4–11 || L2
|- style="background:#fbb;"
| 16 || April 22 || Mets || 3–6 || Harvey (1–3) || Norris (1–3) || Familia (4) || 21,173 || 4–12 || L3
|- style="background:#fbb;"
| 17 || April 23 || Mets || 2–8 || Matz (2–1) || Chacín (0–1) || — || 35,230 || 4–13 || L4
|- style="background:#fbb;"
| 18 || April 24 || Mets || 2–3 || deGrom (2–0) || Blair (0–1) || Familia (5) || 32,085 || 4–14 || L5
|- style="background:#fbb;"
| 19 || April 25 || Red Sox || 0–1 || Porcello (4–0) || Teherán (0–3) || Kimbrel (6) || 22,735 || 4–15 || L6
|- style="background:#fbb;"
| 20 || April 26 || Red Sox || 4–11 || Price (3–0)  || Wisler (0–2) || — || 23,487 || 4–16 ||L7 
|- style="background:#fbb;"
| 21 || April 27 || @ Red Sox || 4–9 || Wright (2–2) || Norris (1–4) || — || 33,308 || 4–17 || L8
|- style="background:#cfc;"
| 22 || April 28 || @ Red Sox || 5–3 || Chacín (1–1)  || Buchholz (0–3) || Vizcaíno (2) || 32,232 || 5–17 || W1 
|- style="background:#fbb;"
| 23 || April 29 || @ Cubs || 1–6 || Strop (1–0) || Johnson (0–3) || — || 34,007 || 5–18 || L1
|- style="background:#bbb;"
| — || April 30 || @ Cubs 
|colspan="7" | Postponed (inclement weather) (Makeup date: July 7, 2016)
|-

|- style="background:#cfc;"
| 24 || May 1 || @ Cubs || 4–3 (10) || Vizcaíno (1–0) || Rondón (0–1) || Grilli (2) || 40,164 || 6–18 || W1
|- style="background:#fbb;"
| 25 || May 2 || @ Mets || 1–4 || Colón (2–1) || Foltynewicz (0–1) || — || 23,847 || 6–19 || L1
|- style="background:#cfc;"
| 26 || May 3 || @ Mets || 3–0 || Wisler (1–2) || Harvey (2–4) || Vizcaíno (3) || 27,356 || 7–19 || W1
|- style="background:#fbb;"
| 27 || May 4 || @ Mets || 0–8 ||  Matz (4–1) || Chacín (1–2) || — || 31,783 || 7–20 || L1
|- style="background:#fbb;"
| 28 || May 6 || D-backs || 2–7 || Greinke (3–2) || Blair (0–2) || — || 23,514 || 7–21 || L2
|- style="background:#fbb;"
| 29 || May 7 || D-backs || 2–4 || Miller (1–3) || Norris (1–5) || Ziegler (6) || 22,178 || 7–22 || L3
|- style="background:#fbb;"
| 30 || May 8 || D-backs || 3–5 || Delgado (1–1) || Johnson (0–4) || Ziegler (7) || 17,106 || 7–23 || L4
|- style="background:#fbb;"
| 31 || May 10 || Phillies || 2–3 || Morgan (1–0) || Wisler (1–3) || Gómez (12) || 14,490 || 7–24 || L5
|- style="background:#cfc;"
| 32 || May 11 || Phillies || 5-1 || Pérez (1–0) || Eickhoff (1–5) || — || 13,760 || 8–24 || W1
|- style="background:#fbb;"
| 33 || May 12 || Phillies || 4–7 || Bailey (2–0) || Grilli (1–2) || Gómez (13) || 15,643 || 8–25 || L1
|- style="background:#fbb;"
| 34 || May 13 || @ Royals || 1–5 || Vólquez (4–3) || Teherán (0–4) || — || 33,132 || 8–26 || L2
|- style="background:#cfc;"
| 35 || May 14 || @ Royals || 5–0 || Foltynewicz (1–1) || Gee (0–1) || — || 36,541 || 9–26 || W1
|- style="background:#fbb;"
| 36 || May 15 || @ Royals || 2–4 (13) || Wang (2–0) || O'Flaherty (0–3) || — || 33,861 || 9–27 || L1
|- style="background:#fbb;"
| 37 || May 16 || @ Pirates || 5–8 || Niese (4–2) || Pérez (1–1) || Melancon (12) || 16,905 || 9–28 || L2
|- style="background:#fbb;"
| 38 || May 17 || @ Pirates || 9–12 || Nicasio (4–3) || Blair (0–3) || Melancon (13) || 19,400 || 9–29 || L3
|- style="background:#cfc;"
| 39 || May 18 || @ Pirates || 3-1 || Teherán (1–4) || Liriano (3–3) || Vizcaíno (4) || 18,201 || 10–29 || W1
|- style="background:#fbb;"
| 40 || May 19 || @ Pirates || 2–8 || Locke (2–3) || Foltynewicz (1–2) || — || 23,074 || 10–30 || L1
|- style="background:#cfc;"
| 41 || May 20 || @ Phillies || 7–1 || Wisler (2–3) || Nola (3–3) || — || 27,257 || 11–30 || W1
|- style="background:#cfc;"
| 42 || May 21 || @ Phillies || 2–0 || Pérez (2–1) || Morgan (1–2) || Vizcaíno (5) || 20,196 || 12–30 || W2
|- style="background:#fbb;"
| 43 || May 22 || @ Phillies || 0–5 || Eickhoff (1–5) || Kelly (0–1) || — || 23,367 || 12–31 || L1
|- style="background:#fbb;"
| 44 || May 24 || Brewers || 1–2 || Blazek (2–1) || Norris (1–6) || Jeffress (12) || 15,185 || 12–32 || L2
|- style="background:#fbb;"
| 45 || May 25 || Brewers || 2–3 (13) ||  Blazek (3–1) || Kelly (0–2) || Torres (1) || 12,869 || 12–33 || L3
|- style="background:#fbb;"
| 46 || May 26 || Brewers || 2–6 || Peralta (3–5) || Wisler (2–4) || Torres (2) || 14,885 || 12–34 || L4
|- style="background:#cfc;"
| 47 || May 27 || Marlins || 4–2 || Krol (1–0) || Phelps (3–3) || Vizcaíno (6) || 19,325 || 13–34 || W1
|- style="background:#cfc;"
| 48 || May 28 || Marlins || 7–2 || O'Flaherty (1–3) || Ureña (1–1) || — || 33,879 || 14–34 || W2
|- style="background:#fbb;"
| 49 || May 29 || Marlins || 3–7 || Koehler (3–5) || Teherán (1–5) || — || 50,247 || 14–35 || L1
|- style="background:#cfc;"
| 50 || May 30 || Giants || 5–3 || Foltynewicz (2–2) || Samardzija (7–3) || — || 23,147 || 15–35 || W1
|- style="background:#fbb;"
| 51 || May 31 || Giants || 0–4 || Peavy (2–5) || Wisler (2–5) || — || 15,723 || 15–36 || L1
|-

|- style="background:#cfc;"
| 53 || June 1 || Giants || 5–4 || Withrow (1–0) || Law (1–1) || — || 15,107 || 16–36 || W1
|- style="background:#fbb;"
| 54 || June 2 || Giants || 0–6 || Bumgarner (7–2) || Blair (0–4) || — || 15,983 || 16–37 || L1
|- style="background:#fbb;"
| 55 || June 3 || @ Dodgers || 2–4 || Maeda (5–3) || Teherán (1–6) || Jansen (16) || 46,366 || 16–38 || L2
|- style="background:#fbb;"
| 56 || June 4 || @ Dodgers || 0–4 || Kershaw (8–1) || Norris (1–7) || — || 47,126 || 16–39 || L3
|- style="background:#fbb;"
| 57 || June 5 || @ Dodgers || 6–12 || Kazmir (5–3) || Wisler (2–6) || — || 47,950 || 16–40 || L4
|- style="background:#fbb;"
| 58 || June 6 || @ Padres || 2–7 || Friedrich (3–1) || Pérez (2–2) || — || 20,203 || 16–41 || L5
|- style="background:#fbb;"
| 59 || June 7 || @ Padres || 3–4 || Thornton (1–0) || Vizcaíno (1–1) || — || 22,198 || 16–42 || L6
|- style="background:#cfc;"
| 60 || June 8 || @ Padres || 4–2 || Teherán (2–6) || Pomeranz (5–6) || Vizcaíno (7) || 22,248 || 17–42 || W1
|- style="background:#cfc;"
| 61 || June 10 || Cubs || 5–1 || Norris (2–7) || Hammel (7–2) || — || 30,547 || 18–42 || W2
|- style="background:#fbb;"
| 62 || June 11 || Cubs || 2–8 || Arrieta (10–1) || Wisler (2–7) || — || 43,114 || 18–43 || L1 
|- style="background:#fbb;"
| 63 || June 12 || Cubs || 2–13 || Lester (8–3) || Gant (0–1) || — || 31,625 || 18–44 || L2
|- style="background:#fbb;"
| 64 || June 13 || Reds || 8–9 || Ohlendorf (5–5) || Vizcaíno (1–2) || Cingrani (7) || 13,198 || 18–45 || L3 
|- style="background:#fbb;"
| 65 || June 14 || Reds || 1–3 || Finnegan (3–4) || Teherán (2–7) || Wood (1) || 13,176 || 18–46 || L4
|- style="background:#cfc;"
| 66 || June 15 || Reds || 9–8 || Ogando (2–1) || Simón (2–7) || — || 14,953 || 19–46 || W1
|- style="background:#cfc;"
| 67 || June 16 || Reds || 7–2 || Wisler (3–7) || Straily (4–3) || — || 21,885 || 20–46 || W2
|- bgcolor="ccffcc"
| 68 || June 17 || @ Mets || 5–1 || Gant (1–1) || Harvey (4–9) || — || 40,148 || 21–46 || W3 
|- style="background:#cfc;"
| 69 || June 18 || @ Mets || 4–3 || Álvarez (1–0) || Reed (1–1) || Johnson (1) || 32,134 || 22–46 || W4 
|- style="background:#cfc;"
| 70 || June 19 || @ Mets || 6–0 || Teherán (3–7) || deGrom (3–4) || — || 41,576 || 23–46 || W5
|- style="background:#cfc;"
| 71 || June 21 || @ Marlins || 3–2 (10) || Withrow (2–0) || Barraclough (3–2) || Vizcaíno (8) || 19,961 || 24–46 || W6
|- style="background:#fbb;"
| 72 || June 22 || @ Marlins || 0–3 || Conley (4–4) || Gant (1–2) || Ramos (23) || 22,642 || 24–47 || L1
|- style="background:#cfc;"
| 73 || June 23 || Mets || 4–3 || Johnson (1–4) || Reed (1–2) || Vizcaíno (9) || 22,324 || 25–47 || W1
|- style="background:#fbb;"
| 74 || June 24 || Mets || 6–8 || Robles (2–3) || Blair (0–5) || Familia (25) || 25,565 || 25–48 || L1
|- style="background:#fbb;"
| 75 || June 25 || Mets || 0–1 (11) || Reed (2–2) || Álvarez (1–1) || Familia (26) || 40,879 || 25–49 || L2
|- style="background:#cfc;"
| 76 || June 26 || Mets || 5–2 || Norris (3–7) || Colón (6–4) || Vizcaíno (10) || 20,484 || 26–49 || W1
|- style="background:#fbb;"
| 77 || June 27 || Indians || 3–8 || Bauer (6–2) || Jenkins (0–1) || — || 15,538 || 26–50 || L1
|- style="background:#fbb;"
| 78 || June 28 || Indians || 3–5 || Kluber (8–7) || Vizcaíno (1–3) || Allen (15) || 19,206 || 26–51 || L2
|- style="background:#fbb;"
| 79 || June 29 || Indians || 0–3 || Salazar (10–3) || De La Cruz (0–1) || Allen (16) || 16,600 || 26–52 || L3
|- style="background:#cfc;"
| 80 || June 30 || Marlins || 8–5 || Álvarez (2–1) || Chen (4–3) || Cabrera (1) || 16,097 || 27–52 || W1
|-

|- style="background:#fbb;"
| 81 || July 1 || Marlins || 5–7 (12) || Wittgren (3–1) || Kelly (0–3) || McGowan (1) || 32,036 || 27–53 || L1
|- style="background:#cfc;"
| 82 || July 2 || Marlins || 9–1 || Harrell (1–0) || Fernández (10–4) || — || 23,448 || 28–53 || W1
|- style="background:#fbb;"
| 83 || July 3 || vs. Marlins (@ Fort Bragg)|| 2–5 || Conley (5–5) || Wisler (3–8) || — || 12,582 || 28–54 || L1 
|- style="background:#fbb;"
| 84 || July 4 || @ Phillies || 2–8 || Eickhoff (6–9) || De La Cruz (0–2) || — || 19,064 || 28–55 || L2
|- style="background:#fbb;"
| 85 || July 5 || @ Phillies || 1–5 || Eflin (1–2) || Foltynewicz (2–3) || — || 18,426 || 28–56 || L3
|- style="background:#fbb;"
| 86 || July 6 || @ Phillies || 3–4 || Neris (3–3) || Vizcaino (1–4) || Gomez (23) || 19,211 || 28–57 || L4
|- style="background:#cfc;"
| 87 || July 7 || @ Cubs || 4–3 (11) || Alvarez (3–1)|| Patton (1–1) || Cabrera (2) || 41,480 || 29–57 || W1
|- style="background:#cfc;"
| 88 || July 8 || @ White Sox || 11–8 || Wisler (4–8)|| Sale (14–3) || — || 26,199 || 30–57 || W2
|- style="background:#fbb;"
| 89 || July 9 || @ White Sox || 4–5 || Quintana (7–8) || Teheran (3–8) || Jones (3) || 23,888 || 30–58 || L1
|- style="background:#cfc;"
| 90 || July 10 || @ White Sox || 2–0 || Foltynewicz (3–3) || Shields (4–10) || Johnson (2) || 29,156 || 31–58 || W1
|- style="text-align:center; background:#bbcaff;"
| colspan="10" | 87th All-Star Game in San Diego, California
|- style="background:#fbb;"
| 91 || July 15 || Rockies ||2–11|| De La Rosa (6–6)  || Harrell (1–1) || — || 27,236 || 31–59 || L1
|- style="background:#fbb;"
| 92 || July 16 || Rockies ||3 – 4|| Logan (1-0) || Johnson (1–5) || Estevez (5) || 28,393 || 31–60 || L2
|- style="background:#cfc;"
| 93 || July 17 || Rockies ||1–0|| Johnson (2–5) || Germen (2–1) || — || 18,873 || 32–60 || W1
|- style="background:#fbb;"
| 94 || July 18 || @ Reds ||2–8|| Finnegan (5–7) || Wisler (4-6) || — || 21,989 || 32–61 || L1
|- style="background:#cfc;"
| 95 || July 19 || @ Reds || 5–4 (11) || Cabrera (1–0) || Cingrani (2–3) || — || 23,080 || 33–61 || W1
|- style="background:#fbb;"
| 96 || July 20 || @ Reds || 3–6 || DeSclafani (5–0) || Harrell (1–2) || — || 22,091 || 33–62 || L1
|- style="background:#fbb;"
| 97 || July 21 || @ Rockies || 3–7 || Bettis (8–6) || Foltynewicz (3–4) || Estevez (7) || 36,527 || 33–63 || L2
|- style="background:#fbb;"
| 98 || July 22 || @ Rockies || 3–4 || Gray (6–4) || De La Cruz (0–3) || Estevez (8) || 35,880 || 33–64 || L3
|- style="background:#fbb;"
| 99 || July 23 || @ Rockies || 4–8 || Anderson (3–3) || Wisler (4–10) || — || 46,195 || 33–65 || L4
|- style="background:#fbb;"
| 100 || July 24 || @ Rockies || 2–7 || Chatwood (9–6) || Jenkins (0–2) || — || 34,695 || 33–66 || L5
|- style="background:#cfc;"
| 101 || July 26 || @ Twins || 2–0 || Harrell (2–2) || Satnana (3–9) || Johnson (3) || 26,690 || 34–66 || W1
|- style="background:#cfc;"
| 102 || July 27 || @ Twins || 9-7 || Foltynewicz (4–4) || Duffey (5–8) || Johnson (4)  || 29,482 || 35–66 || W2
|- style="background:#fbb;"
| 103 || July 28 || Phillies || 5–7 || Nola (6–9) || Wisler (4–11) || Gomez (27) || 22,785 || 35–67 || L1
|- style="background:#cfc;"
| 104 || July 29 || Phillies || 2–1 || Jenkins (1–2) || Velasquez (8–3) || Johnson (5)  || 27,732 || 36–67 || W1
|- style="background:#fbb;"
| 104 || July 30 || Phillies || 5–9 || Hellickson (8–7) || Teheran (3–9) || — || 38,236 || 36–68 || L1
|- style="background:#cfc;"
| 105 || July 31 || Phillies || 2–1 || Cabrera (2–0) || Bailey (3–1) || Johnson (6)  || 27,732 || 37–68 || W1
|-

|- style="background:#fbb;"
| 106 || August 2 || Pirates || 3–5 || Cole (7–6) || Foltynewicz (4–5) || Watson (1) || 20,633 || 37–69 || L1 
|- style="background:#cfc;"
| 107 || August 3 || Pirates || 8–4 || Whalen (1–0) || Locke (8–7) || — || 19,281 || 38–69 || W1
|- style="background:#cfc;"
| 108 || August 4 || Pirates || 5–2 || Cervenka (1–0) || Rivero (0–4) || Johnson (7)  || 20,527 || 39–69 || W2
|- style="background:#fbb;"
| 109 || August 5 || @ Cardinals || 0–1 || García (8–8) || De La Cruz (0–4) || Oh (9) || 42,421 || 39–70 || L1
|- style="background:#cfc;"
| 110 || August 6 || @ Cardinals || 13–5 || Hernández (1–0) || Martínez (10–7) || — || 45,468 || 40–70 || W1
|- style="background:#cfc;"
| 111 || August 7 || @ Cardinals || 6–3 || Foltynewicz (5–5) || Wainwright (9–6) || — || 42,960 || 41–70 || W2
|- style="background:#cfc;"
| 112 || August 8 || @ Brewers || 4–3 (12)|| Cunniff (1–0) || Torres (2–2) || Johnson (9) || 20,976 || 42–70 || W3
|- style="background:#cfc;"
| 113 || August 9 || @ Brewers || 2–1 || Jenkins (2–2) || Peralta (4–8) || Cabrera (3) || 20,048 || 43–70 || W4
|- style="background:#fbb;"
| 114 || August 10 || @ Brewers || 3–4 || Anderson (7–10) || De La Cruz (0–5) || Thornburg (4) || 20,035 || 43–71 || L1
|- style="background:#fbb;"
| 115 || August 11 || @ Brewers || 3–11 || Garza (4–4) || Hernández (1–1) || — || 30,167 || 43–72 || L2
|- style="background:#cfc;"
| 116 || August 12 || @ Nationals || 8–5 || Foltynewicz (6–5) || Strasburg (15–3) || Johnson (10) || 29,089 || 44–72 || W1
|- style="background:#fbb;"
| 117 || August 13 || @ Nationals || 6–7 || López (1–1) || Whalen (1–1) || Melancon (33)  || 38,490 || 44–73 || L1
|- style="background:#fbb;"
| 118 || August 14 || @ Nationals || 1–9 || Roark (13–6) || Jenkins (2–3) || — || 29,107 || 44–74 || L2
|- style="background:#fbb;"
| 119 || August 16 || Twins || 2–4 || Santana (6–9) || De La Cruz (0–6) || Kintzler (12)  || 17,611 || 44–75 || L3
|- style="background:#fbb;"
| 120 || August 17 || Twins || 3–10 || Gibson (5–7) || O'Flaherty (1–4) || — || 19,304 || 44–76 || L4
|- style="background:#fbb;"
| 121 || August 18 || Nationals || 2–8 || López (2–1) || Whalen (1–2) || — || 24,099 || 44–77 || L5
|- style="background:#fbb;"
| 122 || August 19 || Nationals || 6–7 || Glover (1–0) || Johnson (2–6) || Melancon (35) || 30,292 || 44–78 || L6
|- style="background:#fbb;"
| 123 || August 20 || Nationals || 9–11 || Scherzer (13–7) || Jenkins (2–4) || Melancon (36) || 42,421 || 44–79 || L7
|- style="background:#cfc;"
| 124 || August 21 || Nationals || 7–6 (10) || Ramírez (1–0) || Kelley (1–2) || — || 25,341 || 45–79 || W1
|- style="background:#fbb;"
| 125 || August 22 || @ D-backs || 8–9 (10)|| Burgos (1–1) || Gant (1–3) || — || 15,789 || 45–80 || L1
|- style="background:#cfc;"
| 126 || August 23 || @ D-backs || 7–4 || Ramírez (2–0) || Barrett (1–2) || Johnson (11) || 18,780 || 46–80 || W1
|- style="background:#fbb;"
| 127 || August 24 || @ D-backs || 9-10 (10)|| Corbin (5-13) || Ramírez (2-1) || — || 15,376 || 46-81 || L1
|- style="background:#cfc;"
| 128 || August 25 || @ D-backs || 3-1 || Wisler (5-11) || Ray (7-11) || Johnson (12) || 18,698 || 47-81 || W1
|- style="background:#fbb;"
| 129 || August 26 || @ Giants || 0-7 || Samardzija (11-9) || De La Cruz (0-7) || — || 41,283 || 47-82 || L1
|- style="background:#cfc;"
| 130 || August 27 || @ Giants || 3–1 || Foltynewicz (7-5) || Suárez (3-2) || Johnson (13) || 41,635 || 48–82 || W1
|- style="background:#fbb;"
| 131 || August 28 || @ Giants || 4–13 || Bumgarner (13-8) || Blair (0-6) || — || 41,675 || 48–83 || L1
|- style="background:#cfc;"
| 132 || August 30 || Padres || 7–3 || Teheran (4–9) || Jackson (3-5) || — || 20,309 || 49–83 || W1
|- style="background:#cfc;"
| 133 || August 31 || Padres || 8–1 || Wisler (6–11) || Clemens (2-4) || — || 20,899 || 50–83 || W2
|-

|- style="background:#cfc;"
| 134 || September 1 || Padres || 9–6 || Foltynewicz (8–5) || Cosart (0-2) || Johnson (14) || 22,253 || 51–83 || W3
|- style="background:#cfc;"
| 135 || September 2 || @ Phillies || 8–4 || Cabrera (3–0) || Gómez (3-3) || — || 17,175 || 52–83 || W4
|- style="background:#cfc;"
| 136 || September 3 || @ Phillies || 6–4 || Bradley (1–0) || Ramos (1-2) || Cabrera (4) || 19,453 || 53–83 || W5
|- style="background:#cfc;"
| 137 || September 4 || @ Phillies || 2–0 || Teherán (5–9) || Thompson (1-5) || Johnson (15) || 21,322 || 54–83 || W6
|- style="background:#fbb;"
| 138 || September 5 || @ Nationals || 4–6 || Scherzer (16–7) || Weber (1–1) || — || 26,005 || 54–84 || L1
|- style="background:#fbb;"
| 139 || September 6 || @ Nationals || 7–9 || Glover (2–0) || Ramírez (2–2) || Melancon (39) || 17,161 || 54–85 || L2 
|- style="background:#fbb;"
| 140 || September 7 || @ Nationals || 4–5 (11) || Latos (7–2) || Bradley (1–1) || — || 19,894 || 54–86 || L3
|- style="background:#fbb;"
| 141 || September 9 || Mets || 4–6 || Robles (6–4) || Cabrera (3–1) || Familia (48) || 28,225 || 54–87 || L4
|- style="background:#bfb;"
| 142 || September 10 || Mets || 4–3 (10) || Withrow (3–0) || Goeddel (1–1) || — || 47,841 || 55–87 || W1
|- style="background:#fbb;"
| 143 || September 11 || Mets || 3–10 || Lugo (4–2) || Perez (2–3) || — || 32,829 || 55–88 || L1
|- style="background:#bfb;"
| 144 || September 12 || Marlins || 12–7 || Roe (1–0) || Ellington (2–2) || — || 18,271 || 56–88 || W1
|- style="background:#fbb;"
| 145 || September 13 || Marlins || 5–7 || Nicolino (3–6) || Wisler (6–12) || Ramos (35) || 20,125 || 56–89 || L1
|- style="background:#fbb;"
| 146 || September 14 || Marlins || 5–7 || Fernández (15–8) || Teherán (5–10) || Ramos (36) || 21,498 || 56–90 || L2
|- style="background:#fbb;"
| 147 || September 16 || Nationals || 2–7 || Scherzer (17–7) || Gant (1–4) || — || 33,618 || 56–91 || L3
|- style="background:#bfb;"
| 148 || September 17 || Nationals || 7–3 || Collmenter (2–0) || Gonzalez (11–10) || – || 36,016 || 57–91 || W1
|- style="background:#bfb;"
| 149 || September 18 || Nationals || 6–2 (7) || Wisler (7–12) || Ross (7–5) || – || 37,296 || 58–91 || W2
|- style="background:#bfb;"
| 150 || September 19 || @ Mets || 7–3 || Blair (1–6) || Syndergaard (13–9) || — || 29,655 || 59–91 || W3
|- style="background:#bfb;"
| 151 || September 20 || @ Mets || 5–4 || Teherán (6–10) || Gsellman (2–2) || Johnson (16) || 30,764 || 60–91 || W4
|- style="background:#bfb;"
| 152 || September 21 || @ Mets || 4–3 || Krol (2–0) || Familia (3–4) || Johnson (17) || 32,187 || 61–91 || W5
|- style="background:#bfb;"
| 153 || September 22 || @ Marlins || 6–3 || Collmenter (3–0) || Ureña (4–8) || Cabrera (5) || 22,086 || 62–91 || W6
|- style="background:#bfb;"
| 154 || September 23 || @ Marlins || 3–2 || Cunniff (2-0) || Ramos (1-4) || Cabrera || 23,924 || 63-91 || W7
|- style="background:#fbb;"
| 155 || September 24 || @ Marlins ||  4–6 || Ellington (4-2) || Blair (1-7) || Ramos (39) || 26,178 || 63–92 || L1
|- style="background:#bbb;
| – || September 25 || @ Marlins ||colspan=7| Game cancelled (death of Marlins pitcher José Fernandez)   
|- style="background:#bfb;"
| 156 || September 27 || Phillies || 7–6 || Cabrera (4-1) || Hernandez (3-4) || — || 22,348 || 64–92 || W1
|- style="background:#bfb;"
| 157 || September 28 || Phillies || 12–2 || Foltynewicz (9–5) || Morgan (2-11)|| — || 22,104 || 65–92 || W2
|- style="background:#bfb;"
| 158 || September 29 || Phillies || 5–2 || Cabrera (5-1)  || Gomez (3-5) || — || 32,121 || 66–92 || W3
|- style="background:#fbb;"
| 159 || September 30 || Tigers || 2-6 || Norris (4-2) || Wisler (7-13) || — || 41,500 || 66-93 || L1 
|-

|- style="background:#bfb;"
| 160 || October 1 || Tigers || 5–3 || Blair (2–7) || Zimmermann (9-7) || Johnson (19) || 40,124 || 67-93 || W1
|- style="background:#bfb;"
| 161 || October 2 || Tigers || 1–0 || Teheran (7–10) || Verlander (16–9) || Johnson (20) || 51,220 || 68-93 || W2 
|-

|-
| Legend:       = Win       = Loss       = PostponementBold = Braves team member

Roster

Statistics

Batting

Players in bold are on the active major league roster as of the 2022 season.

Note: G = Games played; AB = At bats; R = Runs; H = Hits; 2B = Doubles; 3B = Triples; HR = Home runs; RBI = Runs batted in; Avg. = Batting average; OBP = On-base percentage; SLG = Slugging percentage; SB = Stolen bases

Pitching

Players in bold are on the active major league roster as of 2022.Note: W = Wins; L = Losses; ERA = Earned run average; G = Games pitched; GS = Games started; SV = Saves; IP = Innings pitched; R = Runs allowed; ER = Earned runs allowed; HR = Home runs allowed; BB = Walks allowed; K = StrikeoutsFarm system

LEAGUE CHAMPIONS: Rome

References

External links

2016 Atlanta Braves season at Baseball Reference''
2016 Atlanta Braves season Official Site

Atlanta Braves seasons
Atlanta Braves
Atlanta Braves